Simon Bryant (born 14 February 1965, Exeter, Devon, England) is an Australian chef. Bryant featured alongside South Australian Maggie Beer on the ABC program The Cook and the Chef. The show aired more than 150 episodes over four years, attracting more than 600,000 viewers nationally per week.

Bryant was with Hilton Adelaide for more than 10 years, commencing as a Commis Chef, followed by 18 months as a Chef de Partie in 'The Grange' with Cheong Liew and rapidly working his way up to Senior Sous Chef of 'The Brasserie'. 'The Brasserie' was his break, where he was promoted to Executive Chef overseeing 33 staff, 2 of the state's leading restaurants, a quick service deli, and as South Australia's largest hotel, the largest catering and room service operations in the state.

Awards and presentations
 2007 Hotel Management Magazine Awards for Excellence – Executive Chef of the Year 
 2008 Restaurant and Catering Association (SA) – Chef of the Year 
 'Last Leaf' column in South Australian gourmet magazine Sumptuous.
 South Australian Ambassador for Earth Hour 2008 and 2009.
 WOMAD 2008 – Presented native Australian produce at 'Taste the World'
 Presenter at Department of Environment and Heritage 'Reclaim the Food' Chain event
 Ambassador for the Animal Welfare League and official Food Ambassador for Animals Asia 
 Campaigned for legislative change enabling Food Donor Laws to be changed – Hilton Adelaide now donates all unsold food to the Hutt Street Centre for the homeless daily
 First South Australian business to gain RSPCA Choose Wisely accreditation
 Botanic Gardens Foundation Kitchen Garden Ambassador

Books 

 Vegies and Vegies

 Grains & Other Good Stuff

References

External links
 Official website

Australian television chefs
Living people
1965 births
British emigrants to Australia
Businesspeople from Adelaide